Polevaya is a rural locality and the administrative center of Polevskoy Selsoviet Rural Settlement, Kursky District, Kursk Oblast, Russia. Population:

Geography 
The village is located on the Seym River (a left tributary of the Desna), 98 km from the Russia–Ukraine border, 22 km south-east of the district center – the town Kursk.

 Streets
There are the following streets in the locality: Naberezhnaya, Pristantsionnaya, Pushnaya, Sadovaya, Urochishche Gorki, Urochishche Limany, Shkolnaya and Energetikov (644 houses).

 Climate
Polevaya has a warm-summer humid continental climate (Dfb in the Köppen climate classification).

Transport 

The rural locality is situated 22 km from Kursk Vostochny Airport, 106 km from Belgorod International Airport and 190 km from Voronezh Peter the Great Airport.

References

Notes

Sources

Rural localities in Kursky District, Kursk Oblast